Lasius interjectus, commonly known as the larger yellow ant, is a species of ant belonging to the genus Lasius, and was formerly a part of the genus (now a subgenus) Acanthomyops. Described in 1866 by Mayr, the species is native to the United States.

References

External links

interjectus
Hymenoptera of North America
Insects of the United States
Insects described in 1866